In Search of Sunrise (abbreviated ISOS) is a trance music mix-compilation music CD series released on SongBird, a subdivision of Black Hole Recordings originally founded by Tiësto.

Installments

under Tiësto

The first seven installments in the In Search of Sunrise series were mixed by Tiësto.

The first installment debuted on the Billboard 200 at #170 with 4,200 sales.

Starting with the third album, each compilation was given a subtitle with a certain location that inspired the particular DJ.

For Latin America, the series expanded from a single CD to a 2-CD format.

 In Search of Sunrise (November 22, 1999)
 In Search of Sunrise 2 (November 30, 2000)
 In Search of Sunrise 3: Panama (May 29, 2002)
 In Search of Sunrise 4: Latin America (June 21, 2005)
 In Search of Sunrise 5: Los Angeles (May 25, 2006)
 In Search of Sunrise 6: Ibiza (September 7, 2007)
 In Search of Sunrise 7: Asia (June 10, 2008)
 In Search of Sunrise 7: Asia (Armani Exchange Exclusive) (Limited Edition 3 CD Set) (June 13, 2008)

under Richard Durand

On April 7, 2010, Tiësto announced that, due to his departure from Black Hole Recordings, he would no longer be involved with the In Search of Sunrise series. The following day, Black Hole Recordings announced that the series would be mixed by Dutch producer Richard Durand.

For Australia, the series expanded to a 3-CD format. 

Later installments would feature guest DJs: Las Vegas featured Hungarian DJ duo Myon & Shane 54, Dubai featured British producer/DJ Lange, And Amsterdam, numbered "13.5" due to Durand's "13-phobia", featured American producer/DJ BT.

 In Search of Sunrise 8: South Africa (May 17, 2010)
 In Search of Sunrise 9: India (June 6, 2011)
 In Search of Sunrise 10: Australia (June 18, 2012)
 In Search of Sunrise 11: Las Vegas (June 17, 2013)
 In Search of Sunrise 12: Dubai (June 2, 2014)
 In Search of Sunrise 13.5: Amsterdam (July 20, 2015)

under Markus Schulz

The In Search of Sunrise name re-emerged for a 14th release following a 3-year hiatus. The location subtitle was dropped, but the series retained its 3-CD format. Markus Schulz became the de facto curator for the series, having been credited on all post-Richard Durand releases through 2022.

 In Search of Sunrise 14: (Mixed By Markus Schulz, Andy Moor & Gabriel & Dresden) (June 29, 2018)
 In Search of Sunrise 15: (Mixed by Markus Schulz, Jerome Isma-Ae & Orkidea): (November 8, 2019)
 In Search of Sunrise 16: (Mixed by Markus Schulz, Giuseppe Ottaviani, and Sunlounger): (August 7, 2020)
In Search of Sunrise 17: (Mixed by Markus Schulz, Kryder, and Kyau & Albert): (August 5, 2021)
In Search of Sunrise 18: (Mixed by Markus Schulz, Matt Fax, and Dennis Sheperd): (September 2, 2022)

DVD
In the summer 2010 Tiësto released a DVD of his spring tour in Asia. From the Elements of Life World Tour and the beginning of his new world tour In Search of Sunrise: Summer Tour 2008.

The DVD includes many tracks from his In Search of Sunrise 7: Asia Album.

 Asia Tour DVD (June 21, 2010)

Tours
 In Search of Sunrise: Asia Tour 2006
 In Search of Sunrise: Summer Tour 2008

Chart positions

Edits and remixes

 "Delerium – Silence (DJ Tiësto's In Search of Sunrise Edit)"
 "Delerium – Silence (DJ Tiësto's In Search of Sunrise Remix)"
 "Delerium – Innocente (DJ Tiësto In Search of Sunrise Remix)"
 "Abnea – Velvet Moods (DJ Tiësto In Search of Sunrise Remix)"
 "Conjure One – Tears from the Moon (DJ Tiësto's In Search of Sunrise Remix)"
 "Solarstone and JES - Like a Waterfall (In Search of Sunrise Edit)"
 "Ahmet Ertenu - Why (In Search of Sunrise Edit)"
 "Gabriel & Dresden - Arcadia (In Search of Sunrise Edit)"
 "Dominic Plaza - Sounds Rushing (In Search of Sunrise Edit)"
 "Imogen Heap - Hide & Seek (Tiësto's In Search of Sunrise Remix)"
 "See Inside (Richard Durand's In Search of Sunrise Remix)	Niko Pavlidis Feat. ROW"

Singles
This is a list of singles released through Black Hole Recordings and any of its sub-labels, such as SongBird and Magik Muzik from the compilation series.

ISOS:
 Tiësto - Sparkles (Black Hole) 1999
 BT - Mercury & Solace (Black Hole) 1999
ISOS2:
 BT - Dreaming (Black Hole) 1999
 Kamaya Painters - Summerbreeze (Black Hole) 2000
 LN Movement - Golden Desert (SongBird / I.C.E) 2001
ISOS3: Panama
 Andain - Summer Calling (Black Hole) 2002
 Way Out West - Mindcircus (Black Hole) 2002
 Tiësto - In My Memory (Magik Muzik) 2003
ISOS4: Latin America
 Tiësto - UR (Magik Muzik) 2005
 Solarstone - Like A Waterfall (Magik Muzik) 2006
ISOS5: Los Angeles
 Estuera - Tales From The South (Magik Muzik) 2004
 Way Out West - Don't Forget Me (Black Hole) 2005
 Mark Norman - Colour My Eyes (Magik Muzik) 2006
 Global Experience - Zanzibar (Black Hole) 2006
 Progression - Technophobia (Magik Muzik) 2006
 A Boy Called Joni - Green Astronauts (Black Hole) 2006
 JES - People Will Go (Magik Muzik) 2007

ISOS6: Ibiza
 Andy Duguid - Don't Belong (Black Hole) 2007
 First State - Falling (In Trance We Trust) 2007
 Moonbeam - See The Difference Inside (SongBird) 2007
 Deadmau5 - Arguru (SongBird) 2008
 Marcus Schössow - Chase My Rabbit (Black Hole) 2008
 Progression - Different Day, Different Light (Black Hole) 2008
 Allure - Somewhere Inside (Magik Muzik) 2008
 JES - Imagination (Magik Muzik) 2008
 Clear View - Tell Me (SongBird) 2008
 Steve Forte Rio - A New Dawn (SongBird) 2008
ISOS7: Asia
 Sied van Riel - Rush (Black Hole) 2008
 Cary Brothers - Ride (SongBird) 2008
 Andy Duguid - Wasted (Black Hole) 2008
 Carl B. - Just A Thought (In Trance We Trust) 2008
 Zoo Brazil - Crossroads (Avanti) 2008
 JPL - Whenever I May Find Her (In Trance We Trust) 2008
 Airbase - Denial (In Trance We Trust) 2008
 Beltek - Kenta (Avanti) 2008
 Allure - Power of You (Magik Muzik) 2008

References
Report about In Search Of Sunrise 8 release party in Moscow

DJ mix album series
Compilation album series